is a Japanese former women's singles tennis and doubles tennis player. 

She was the top ranked player in Japan in 1979 and was ranked as high as number 89 in the world. She reached the third round of the 1988 French Open and also played in the Australian Open. She was living in Tokyo. Yanagi 4 singles and 6 doubles finals. She has won 1 singles titles and 2 doubles titles on the ITF.

Masako Yanagi played 1982 one singles and two doubles ITF Independent Tour finals.

ITF finals

Singles (1–3)

Doubles (2–4)

ITF Independent Tour

Singles

Doubles

References

External links 
 Official site
 
 

Japanese female tennis players
1959 births
Living people
Sportspeople from Osaka
Asian Games medalists in tennis
Tennis players at the 1982 Asian Games
Asian Games bronze medalists for Japan
Medalists at the 1982 Asian Games
Universiade medalists in tennis
Universiade silver medalists for Japan